Norman Strung (October 21, 1941 - October 17, 1991) was an English professor, outdoor guide, magazine editor and free-lance writer, focusing on outdoor recreational activities involving fishing and hunting.

Life 
Born in New York in 1941, Strung eventually moved to Bozeman, Montana, where he received his bachelor of science from Montana State University and married Priscilla Hoerschgen, both in 1963. Strung then attended the University of Montana in Missoula between 1963 and 1964, returning to Montana State immediately afterwards to begin teaching English. His early career involved teaching at the college while also working as an outdoor guide for both hunting and fishing. Strung was a free-lance writer for most of this time as well, contributing to many various outdoor publications throughout his life. This includes being an associate editor for Field and Stream, consultant for the Hunting and Fishing Library of America, and outdoor editor for Mechanix Illustrated.

Writing career 
While teaching English at Montana State University from 1964-1967, Strung fully began his writing career. Around June 1966, Strung provided correspondence for the Field and Stream article, "The Month the Madison Goes Wild," starting his work in magazine articles.  Strung then began writing for books as well, coauthoring The Fisherman's Almanac and Family Fun Around the Water in 1970. Most of Strung's following work continued to focus on the outdoors and fishing, and by the end of his life had authored, coauthored, or edited at least 15 different books. Strung also operated under two different pseudonyms, "Bart Yaeger" and "Asouff Barkee" for a large amount of his magazine work. Strung also acted as a ghostwriter for one author, Walter Cook, for several articles, including "Woodland Bison: World's Rarest Trophy" in the Sports Afield magazine.

Legacy 
For the remainder of his life, Strung continued his writing career and outdoor pursuits, being heavily involved in the Outdoor Writers Association of America until a cancer diagnosis. This development led Strung to eventually take his own life on October 17th, 1991, nearing his 50th birthday. Strung's written work and materials are currently held within the Montana State University Archives and Special Collections, available for public research and study.

References

Further reading 
Norm Strung, "I've always lived life on my terms".

External links 
Norman Strung Papers, 1966-1982. Held at Montana State University Archives and Special Collections

1941 births
1991 deaths
American academics
Magazine writers